Moscow is an unincorporated community in Marengo County, Alabama, United States.

Geography

References

Unincorporated communities in Alabama
Unincorporated communities in Marengo County, Alabama